William Thomas Crespinel (9 July 1890 – 19 June 1987) was the inventor of a bipack process, which allowed any cinematic camera to shoot color film. In 1932 he developed Cinecolor.

Biography
He was born in Weymouth, England on 9 July 1890. He experimented with early color photography as a teenager. In 1906 he joined Kinemacolor. In 1932 he developed Cinecolor and started a company to sell the process, making himself president. He retired as president of Cinecolor in 1948. He died in 1987 in Laguna Beach, California.

References

1890 births
1987 deaths
People from Weymouth, Dorset
20th-century British inventors